Portugal competed at the 1932 Summer Olympics in Los Angeles, United States.

A delegation of six competitors (all men) participated in three sports (lowest since Stockholm 1912); however, no medal was won.

Athletics

Men's 100m:
 António Sarsfield Rodrigues — 1st round: 5th (heat 1)

Modern pentathlon

Two male pentathletes represented Portugal in 1932.

Men's Individual Competition:

 Rafael Afonso de Sousa — 22nd (102 points)
 Horse riding — 21st (111,5 points)
 Fencing (individual sword) — 23rd (10 points)
 Shooting (pistol) — 17th (176 points)
 Swimming (300m free-style) — 21st (6.42,1 min)
 Cross-country — 20th (19.09,0 min)
 Sebastião de Freitas Branco de Herédia — 23rd (106 points)
 Horse riding — 22nd (466 points)
 Fencing (individual sword) — 17th (18 points)
 Shooting (pistol) — 24th (130 points)
 Swimming (300m free-style) — 20th (6.17,4 min)
 Cross-country — 23rd (20.15,6 min)

Shooting

Men's 25m Rapid Fire Pistol (60 shots):
 José Maria Ferreira — 7th
 Rafael Afonso de Sousa — 9th

Men's 50m Rifle Prone:
 Francisco António Real — 7th
 José Maria Ferreira — 23rd
 Manuel Guerra — 20th

Officials
 César de Melo (chief of mission)
 Francisco António Real (shooting)

References

External links
Official Olympic Reports
International Olympic Committee results database

Nations at the 1932 Summer Olympics
1932 Summer Olympics
1932 in Portuguese sport